Bridgeport High School is a public high school in Bridgeport, Ohio. It is the only high school in the Bridgeport Exempted Village School District. Bridgeport plays in the Ohio Valley Athletic Conference. Their mascot is the Bulldog and the school colors are Columbia blue, black, and white. The school moved to its current location at 55707 Industrial Dr. in January 2007. The new school complex houses all Pre-K - 12 students.

OHSAA State Championships 

 Boys Wrestling – 1959, 1988

Notable alumni 
 Bobby Douglas - Iowa State University wrestling coach, Olympic wrestler and coach; Hall of Famer.
 John Havlicek - forward for Ohio State University basketball, drafted by the National Football League's Cleveland Browns and the National Basketball Association's, Boston Celtics, Basketball Hall of Fame, NBA Finals most valuable player, NBA All-Star.  He is the Celtics' all-time leader in points scored (26,395) and games played.  He won 8 NBA titles with the Celtics and was elected to the Naismith Memorial Basketball Hall of Fame.
 Phil Niekro - pitcher for the Atlanta Braves, New York Yankees, Cleveland Indians, Toronto Blue Jays; 318 career major league wins, National League Gold Glove winner, Baseball Hall of Fame.
 Joe Niekro - pitcher for West Liberty State College, Chicago Cubs, San Diego Padres, Detroit Tigers, Atlanta Braves, Houston Astros, New York Yankees, Minnesota Twins; 221 career major league wins.
 Bill Jobko - linebacker for Ohio State University, drafted in the 1958 by the Los Angeles Rams, and played for them from 1958 to 1962. He also played for the Minnesota Vikings from 1963 to 1965 and the Atlanta Falcons in 1966.
 Johnny Blatnik - outfielder for the Philadelphia Phillies in 1948–1950 and St. Louis Cardinals in 1950. He had a .407 slugging percentage in his first season with Phillies. Played baseball at Bridgeport High School, and in the Bridgeport High School Sports Hall of Fame.
 Stan Goletz, pinch hitter for the Chicago White Sox in 1941.

See also 
 East Central Ohio ESC

References

External links 
 

High schools in Belmont County, Ohio
Public high schools in Ohio
Public middle schools in Ohio